Terry Notary (born August 14, 1968) is an American actor, stunt co-ordinator/double and movement coach. Notary mainly portrays creatures and animals for the film and television industry, and is known for his motion capture performances in films like Avatar, The Adventures of Tintin: Secrets of the Unicorn, the Planet of the Apes reboot series, The Hobbit trilogy, and Kong: Skull Island. In 2018, Notary played Cull Obsidian in the Marvel Studios films Avengers: Infinity War and Avengers: Endgame.

Early life
Born in San Rafael, California, Notary was diagnosed as being severely hyperactive at age 7. His parents enrolled him in gymnastics class to burn off excess energy. He won a gymnastics scholarship at UCLA, where he graduated with a major in theatre.

Career
Notary's first career was as a performer with Cirque du Soleil. His first job as a stunt movement coach was on Dr. Seuss' How the Grinch Stole Christmas. Director Ron Howard was hiring Cirque gymnasts for the film, and after sufficiently impressing Howard, Notary was offered the job of teaching all the actors how to move. Notary followed this new career path to Tim Burton's Planet of the Apes, for which he prepared by studying ape movements at the LA County Zoo. Notary's first motion capture film was Avatar, where he was the movement coach for the Na'vi.

Swedish director Ruben Östlund hired Notary when casting his Palme d'Or-winning 2017 film The Square. For Oleg, a character who acts like an ape, Östlund discovered Notary after running a Google search for "actor imitating monkey" and viewing one of Notary's performances (which was for an audition for Planet of the Apes). His performance in that single scene, in which a performance artist acts like a hostile ape at a fancy dinner, was widely praised, The Independent calling it "the most tense, uncomfortable scene of the year."

Filmography

References

External links
 

Living people
American stunt performers
American male film actors
Actors from San Rafael, California
1968 births
Male motion capture actors